Jennifer Hertz (born 8 November 1964) is a former American rugby union player. She was a member of the  squad that won the inaugural 1991 Women's Rugby World Cup in Wales after defeating England 19–6 in the Final. 

In 2017, Hertz and the 1991 World Cup squad were inducted into the United States Rugby Hall of Fame.

References 

1964 births
Living people
United States women's international rugby union players
American female rugby union players